Count Apollos Apollosovich Musin-Pushkin (February 17, 1760 – April 18, 1805) was a Russian chemist and plant collector. He led a botanical expedition to the Caucasus in 1802 with his friend botanist Friedrich August Marschall von Bieberstein.

In 1797, he was elected a foreign member of the Royal Swedish Academy of Sciences. He was a member of the Russian mining board and developed several new methods of refining and processing of platinum. The genus of Puschkinia commemorates his name.

References

1760 births
1805 deaths
Chemists from the Russian Empire
Russian nobility
18th-century botanists from the Russian Empire
Russian inventors
Members of the Royal Swedish Academy of Sciences
Honorary members of the Saint Petersburg Academy of Sciences
Fellows of the Royal Society